El Potro: Unstoppable is a 2018 Argentine biographical film directed by Lorena Muñoz and written by Lorena Muñoz and Tamara Viñes. The film tells the story of the rise as a cuarteto singer Rodrigo “El Potro” Bueno, who becomes an Argentinian cuarteto star, but dies in a car accident in 2000.

Cast 
 Rodrigo Romero as Rodrigo
 Florencia Peña as Betty Olave
 Fernán Mirás as Oso
 Daniel Aráoz as Eduardo "Pichín" Bueno
 Jimena Barón as Marixa Balli
 Malena Sánchez as Patricia "Pato" Pacheco
 Diego Cremonesi as Ángel
 Julieta Vallina as Rodrigo's aunt
 Simja Dujov as Rodrigo's band musician
 Luis Mario Altamirano as Rodrigo's band musician
 Ramiro Bueno as Rodrigo's band musician

References

External links 
 
 
 

2018 films
2018 biographical drama films
Argentine biographical drama films
Spanish-language Netflix original films
2010s Spanish-language films
2018 drama films
2010s Argentine films